David Andrade may refer to:

 Omar Arellano (footballer, born 1967), Mexican football manager and former midfielder
 Omar Arellano (footballer, born 1987), Mexican football midfielder